Albania competed at the 2020 Winter Youth Olympics in Lausanne, Switzerland from 9 to 22 January 2020.

Albania made it Winter Youth Olympics debut.

Alpine skiing

Boys

See also
Albania at the 2020 Summer Olympics

References

2020 in Albanian sport
Nations at the 2020 Winter Youth Olympics
Albania at the Youth Olympics